Technisonic Studios was a production company in St Louis, Missouri. Founded in 1929, it was the largest and oldest production facility in St. Louis, used to shoot feature films and television commercials. It contained a recording studio where Ike & Tina Turner cut their first track in 1960, and Chuck Berry recorded there in the 1960s and 1970s.

History 
Originally located at 1201 S. Brentwood Blvd., the studio was later moved to 500 S. Ewing Ave.

Radio series Mr. Keen, The Lone Ranger and The Green Hornet were recorded at Technisonic for delayed broadcast.

In 1960, musician Ike Turner booked studio time at Technisonic Studios to record "A Fool In Love" with singer Art Lassiter. When Lassiter didn't show up for the session, Turner recorded the song with his backup vocalist Little Ann who he later renamed Tina Turner thus beginning created the Ike & Tina Turner.

After leaving Chess Records, rock and roll musician Chuck Berry recorded his sides for Mercury Records at Technisonic Studios in 1966.

The 2004 documentary The World’s Greatest Fair, about the 1904 Louisiana Purchase Exposition, was produced by Technisonic Studios.

Technisonic Studios closed in 2010.

List of artists recorded 

 Ike & Tina Turner
 Larry And The Downbeats
 Roy & The Bristols
 The Marauders
 Chuck Berry

List of albums recorded 

 1961: Davey Bold – A Bold Knight With Davey Bold
 1962: Henry Townsend – Tired Of Bein' Mistreated
 1970: Nancy Jent – ....At Last
 1973: Chuck Berry – Bio
 1975: Chuck Berry – Chuck Berry
 1976: Charles Drain – Dependable
 1977: High Inergy – Turnin' On
 1979: Vincent Paul & Friends – Paradise
 1990: Bobby McFerrin – Medicine Music

List of network shows recorded 

 Mr. Keen, Tracer of Lost Persons
 The Lone Ranger
 The Green Hornet

References

External links 
Technisonic Studios on Miano.tv

1929 establishments in Missouri
Recording studios in the United States
American film studios
Music of St. Louis
Companies based in St. Louis
Films set in St. Louis